Vojinović is a Serbian surname.

Vojinović may also refer to:
Vojinović Bridge, located in Vučitrn, Kosovo
Vojinović Tower, city fortifications in Vučitrn, Kosovo,

See also